Rakino Island is one of the many islands in the Hauraki Gulf, an arm of the Pacific Ocean to the northeast of Auckland, New Zealand.

Rakino is a small island north-east of Motutapu Island. The two most popular bays have public access, but three others also have access from the sea. There are smaller bays and beaches without public access. The public wharf is at the south end of Sandy Bay, and a barge access ramp is at the western end of Sanford Way in Home Bay. The hilly topography comprises a fertile layer of volcanic topsoil from Rangitoto Island that overlays a thick mantle of clay soil which in turn overlays greywacke rock. The island is mostly in pasture with pockets of coastal pohutukawa.

There are around 76 dwellings on Rakino Island though the permanent population is only 21 as of 2019. Rakino, with its few permanent residents and its small size, and with a limited public ferry service, has little attraction for commuters. Residents welcome its isolation and privacy.

History
Sir George Grey, governor of New Zealand, bought Rakino in 1862. He ordered trees and started building a house in Home Bay but he lost interest when Kawau Island became available. During the 1860s the prisoners from the Invasion of the Waikato phase of the New Zealand Wars were brought to Auckland, some were housed in the hulks Marion and Manukau at anchor in the harbour and a small party was settled at Rakino, where a house and gardening supplies were provided. The experiment was a failure and soon abandoned. There is an entry in the Appendices to the House of Representatives Journal which says "Ihaka did not thrive much on the island and died there, it is presumed of homesickness and a broken heart."

In 1874 Albert Sanford leased the island from Sir George Grey before his wife, Elizabeth Sanford, bought it in 1904. He and his family lived there for nearly 80 years. He was one of the founders of the Auckland commercial fishing fleet. His company started on Rakino Island in 1881, and he sold fish on the wharves at the bottom of Queen St. “Sanford Limited” was incorporated in 1904. The family home he built still stands in Home Bay. It was built of kauri logs rafted from Mercury Bay on the Coromandel Peninsula.

In 1963, the island was bought by Dr Maxwell Rickard, president of the UPO (United Peoples' Organisation (Worldwide) Incorporated), with the aim of setting up a philanthropic community. Rickard was a clinical psychologist and hypnotherapist and also owned an Auckland nightclub and toured as a professional hypnotherapist under the name "The Great Ricardo". Plans for the island included a clinic for disturbed and nervous patients, an international orphanage, a refuge for unmarried mothers and homes for the elderly.

Communication on the island was a problem, so the world's first solar-powered telephone was installed. While widespread use of mobile phones has reduced reliance on landlines, the phone is still in use and local calling to Auckland is free.

Biodiversity
In 2002 the invasive Norwegian rat was eradicated from Rakino Island.

See also 
 List of islands of New Zealand
 New Zealand outlying islands

References

External links 
 Rakino Ratepayers Association Official Blog

Islands of the Hauraki Gulf
Islands of the Auckland Region
Populated places in the Auckland Region
Populated places around the Hauraki Gulf / Tīkapa Moana
 rakinoisland.org